Yes 101 (100.8, 101.0 F.M.) is an English radio station in Sri Lanka. Yes FM principally plays contemporary hit music.

Yes 101 commenced broadcasting on December 10, 1993, at 6.00 am. It is one of the radio channels owned by The Capital Maharaja Organization Ltd, a leading conglomerate in Sri Lanka. The main target audience age groups are teens and young adults. Its broadcast ranges from contemporary hit music to breaking news.

Presenters and Shows
Yes FM's DJs are some of the most popular in Sri Lanka. Since its inception the station has played host to a number of International DJ's.

Shows
* The Morning Fix with Dom and Asanka
 YES 101 Weekdays with Josh and Tash
 YES 101 Afternoons with Shezad
 YES 101 Evenings with Shey & Brian
 The Nighttime Takeover with SnowV
 Active Sounds
 Weekend Mix Tapes with Shevin
 Phatt 30 with Shezad
 The Score
 Breakfast 101
 Home Grown Top 15 with Yazmin
 Easy 101
 Release Yourself with Roger Sanchez
 In The Mood with Nicole Moudaber
 Spinnin' Deep with The Deep Mix
 Claptone's Clapcast
 Underground Therapy with Jay Vibes
 Group Therapy with Above & Beyond
 A State of Trance with Armin Van Buuren
 The Malinchak Show with Chris Malinchak
 Monstercat with Silk Showcase
 No Xcuses with EDX
 Purified Radio with Nora En Pure
 Panic Room with Voodoo Child
 Vamos Radio Show with Rio De La Duna
 Sister Bliss In Session
 Toolroom Radio with Mark Knight
 Sunsets with Chicane
 The Anjunadeep Edition
 Transitions with John Digweed
 KU DE TA Radio
 Traxsource Live
 Guido's Lounge Café
 Area10 On Air with MK

Former shows 

 Weekend Top 30 and Remix Top 30 wih Hollywood Hamilton
 Protocol Radio with Nicky Romero
 Tiësto's Club Life
 Rick Dees Weekly Top 40
 Nocturnal with Matt Darey
 Global with Carl Cox
 The Dave Koz Show
 Planet Perfecto with Paul Oakenfold
 Spinnin Sessions with Matt Thiel
 Sankeys Ibiza Radio with Kellie Allen
 UMF Radio with RioTgear
 Future Sound of Egypt with Aly & Fila
 Rebirth Radio with Rachit
 Cycles Radio with Max Graham
 Club 101 with Colombo House Mafia
 Drumcode Live with Adam Beyer
 Identity with Sander van Doorn
 Cr2 Live & Direct with MYNC
 Darklight Sessions with Fedde Le Grand
 Kryder's Kryteria Radio

References

External links
 Yes FM official website

Contemporary hit radio stations
English-language radio stations in Sri Lanka
MBC Networks